The Manueline Ordinances were an exhaustive compilation of the entire legal system in Portugal and its colonial possessions, that was issued in 1512 by King Manuel I as part of his reform of the public administration. The Manueline Ordinances saw three different revisions (known as the "first system", "second system", and "third system" of the Ordinances).

The Manueline Ordinances superseded the Alfonsine Ordinances (King Afonso V, 1446), and were in force until they were replaced by the Philippine Ordinances (King Philip I, 1595).

References

Slavery law
Law of Portugal
Slavery in Portugal